Eric Arthur Kriss (born 1949) is an American musician and business executive who served as Secretary of Administration and Finance in Massachusetts Governor Romney's cabinet (January 2003 – October 2005), and as assistant A&F secretary under Governor William Weld (January 1991 – February 1993).  Kriss is currently the Entrepreneur in Residence at the University of Miami.

In 1976, Kriss produced and performed on Mike Bloomfield's If You Love These Blues, Play 'Em As You Please, nominated for a Grammy Award.  He launched the instructional book and record division of Guitar Player Magazine and also co-founded Inner City Records, voted the Record Label of the Year in the 1979 International Jazz Critics Poll.

In 1984, Kriss helped launch Bain Capital, which now manages over $65 billion in assets. He was
CEO of MediQual Systems (1993–98), a healthcare information company, and founder/CEO of MediVision (1983–1989), a network of eye surgery centers.

Municipal Turnarounds 
On September 11, 1991, the Massachusetts state legislature approved Governor William Weld's emergency request to appoint a state receiver to take over the City of Chelsea's bankrupt municipal government, the first state-designed municipal receivership in U.S. history.  Weld named Jim Carlin, a businessman and former state Secretary of Transportation, to become the Chelsea receiver, reporting to Eric Kriss, who, as the assistant Administration and Finance secretary, had drafted the Chelsea legislation.

Chelsea, directly across the Mystic River from Boston, had long been in economic decline with a spiraling fiscal crisis.  Carlin and Kriss immediately undertook a broad municipal turnaround, with a focus on labor negotiations with the local Firefighters union. Boston University, already involved in local education, took over school administration.

Within two years, Chelsea's budget was balanced, a restructured firefighters contract was negotiated, city operations were streamlined, and new school construction was underway. As the Receivership achieved stability, a charter change in 1995 implemented a new efficient council-manager form of government. Increased emphasis on economic development and capital improvement led to an influx of new business, and, as the turnaround reached maturity in 1998, Chelsea was named an All-American City by the National Civic League.

In 2004, Springfield, the third largest city in Massachusetts and long suffering from economic decline, requested extraordinary state assistance to meet its financial obligations.  Kriss, now Secretary for Administration and Finance, drafted a new receivership bill, modeled after his 1991 Chelsea legislation, that expanded upon the receiver's powers by suspending Chapter 150E, a key law that enfranchised public sector unions and defined the collective bargaining process in Massachusetts.  After heated debate and intensive lobbying by public labor unions, the legislature placed Springfield into a state receivership controlled by Secretary Kriss on June 30, 2004, but without the proposed suspension of the Chapter 150E labor law.

Without the Chapter 150E suspension, the state receivership entered into a long collective bargaining process with the teachers' union. In September 2006 agreement was finally reached on a new contract that included merit pay, the first time that student performance was explicitly tied to teacher compensation in a large urban school district in Massachusetts.

The Springfield receivership, as in the earlier Chelsea experience, balanced the municipal budget, streamlined operations, and earned an upgrade in the city's bond rating.  On June 30, 2009, the receivership returned governance of the city to local officials.

In February 2004, Kriss advocated the elimination of the monopoly granted to public sector unions through state laws such as Chapter 150E in Massachusetts.  These remarks, plus the controversy over the original Kriss draft of the Springfield receivership legislation that suspended Chapter 150E, motivated Harvard University's John F. Kennedy School of Government to host a debate between Secretary Kriss and two labor union supporters, Economics Professor Richard B. Freeman, co-faculty director of the Harvard University Trade Union Program, and Jack Donahue, a Kennedy School lecturer and director of the Weil Program in Collaborative Governance.

The threat of escalating municipal labor costs due to Chapter 150E led Secretary Kriss to introduce the concept of Municipal Stability Factors as an online assessment tool for local officials.  When he left office in September 2005, Kriss warned that overly generous contracts with public employees, together with a failure to control employee healthcare costs and an aversion to development that could spur new tax revenue, have doomed cities and towns to a dark financial future.  "This is a quiet crisis, a crisis of attrition. It's not a Katrina, but if we extrapolate over the next couple of years, it will get worse and worse and worse."

Open Formats 
In early 2005, Kriss, along with state CIO Peter J. Quinn, advocated using open formats in public records: "It is an overriding imperative of the American democratic system that we cannot have our public documents locked up in some kind of proprietary format, perhaps unreadable in the future, or subject to a proprietary system license that restricts access."

At a September 16, 2005 meeting with the Mass Technology Leadership Council Kriss raised state sovereignty as the overriding issue surrounding public records. While supporting the principle of private intellectual property rights, he said sovereignty trumped any private company's attempt to control the state's public records through claims of intellectual property.

Subsequently, in September 2005, Massachusetts became the first state to formally endorse OpenDocument formats for its public records and, at the same time, reject proprietary formats such those used in Microsoft's Office software suite.

Massachusetts Turnpike 
In August 2006, Governor Romney and the Massachusetts Turnpike Authority board asked Kriss to lead a comprehensive review of the Turnpike following the ouster of Chairman Matthew J. Amorello and the collapse of a portion of the roof of the Ted Williams Tunnel. On October 19, 2006, Kriss recommended to the board that all tolls, except on airport tunnels, be eliminated.  The board then voted to remove tolls west of the 128 toll plaza by June 30, 2007, the first step in dismantling the Authority's original mission begun in 1952.

In June 2009, Governor Deval Patrick signed legislation to formally end the Turnpike as a stand-alone authority on November 1, 2009.

See also 
 Adoption of Open Document format in Massachusetts
 Bain & Company (consulting firm)
 Bain Capital
 Springfield Finance Control Board

Notes

External links 
Music and Performing Arts
 On Performance by Eric Kriss: Collected performing arts criticism and interviews from the 1970s - Fair Isle Press, 2010 paperback edition
 Six Blues-Roots Pianists by Eric Kriss - Oak Publications, 1973*
 Barrelhouse & Boogie Piano by Eric Kriss - Oak Publications, 1973
 Beginning Blues Piano by Eric Kriss - Acorn Music Press, 1977

Business
 Eric Kriss Practicum series at University of Miami, 2010
 Index of INC Magazine articles, interviews, and commentary
 How to Survive the End of Inflation (Eric Kriss) - INC Magazine, January 1993
 So You Want to be a CEO? (Eric Kriss) - INC Magazine, October 1998
 Inevitable Electrics (Eric Kriss) - 2008 white paper

Government
 No More Public Sector Union Monopoly (Eric Kriss) - CommonWealth Magazine, Summer 2004
 Fourth Branch of Government (Eric Kriss) - February 2004
 Open Mind on Open Source (Eric Kriss presentation) - June 2004
 Executive and Management Compensation report - November 2004
 Budget Imbalance (Eric Kriss) - CommonWealth Magazine, Winter 2004
 Kriss Report to Massachusetts Turnpike Authority board, October 2006
 ODF vs. OOXML: War of the Words - Eric Kriss, Peter Quinn and the ETRM, December 2007

Private equity and venture capital investors
1949 births
Living people
Amherst College alumni
Bain Capital people
Massachusetts Secretaries of Administration and Finance
Bain & Company
American company founders
University of Chicago Booth School of Business alumni
American chief executives